Short track speed skating was a demonstration sport at the 1988 Winter Olympic Games. Those competition events took place at the Max Bell Arena in Calgary. This was the only time in the history of Olympic Games that the short track venue was shared with curling.

Medal table

Men's events

500 m

Final A
February 23, 1988

Final B

1000 m

Final A
February 24, 1988

Final B

1500 m

Final A
February 22, 1988

Final B

3000 m

Final
February 25, 1988

5000 m relay

Final
February 25, 1988

Women's events

500 m

Final A
February 22, 1988

Final B

1000 m

Final A
February 25, 1988

Final B

1500 m

Final A
February 23, 1988

Final B

3000 m
February 24, 1988

3000 m relay
February 24, 1988

External links

 Olympic Review - March 1988
 Short Track Speed Skating at the 1988 Winter Olympics at Olympedia.org

 
Olympic demonstration sports
1988 Winter Olympics
1988 Winter Olympics events
Olympics
Olympics, 1988
Men's events at the 1988 Winter Olympics
Women's events at the 1988 Winter Olympics